Simon Clark may refer to:
Simon Clark (novelist) (born 1958), English horror novel writer
Simon Clark (broadcaster) (born 1960), British television sports presenter and correspondent
Simon Clark (Australian footballer) (born 1967), Australian rules footballer for Richmond
Simon Clark (English footballer) (born 1967), English former professional footballer and manager
Andy Clark (musician) (Simon Andrew Clark), English keyboard and synthesizer player

See also
Simon Clarke (disambiguation)
Clark (surname)